Cryptomyzus ribis is a species of true bug found in Europe and described by the Swedish taxonomist, Carl Linnaeus in 1758. The larvae feed on the leaves of current bushes (Ribes species), especially red currant, creating abnormal plant growths, known as galls.

Description
Signs of Cryptomyzus ribis are domed blisters on the leaves of, mainly red and white current bushes. Soon after the leaves open in the spring, the galls are yellow and turn red by the early summer. Leaves can also be crinkled, with a colony of yellow-greenish aphids living in the hairy depressions on the underside of the leaves. Cultivars of red currants are preferred. During the summer some mature aphids leave the galls and migrate to a secondary host, hedge woundwort (Stachys sylvatica), while others stay on currants. All produce several generations, and in the autumn, females lay overwintering eggs on currant twigs, which hatch the following spring. 

Red current (Ribes rubrum) is the preferred species (including varieties of white currant), but the aphid has also been recorded on mountain currant (Ribes alpinum), wild black currant (Ribes americanum), golden currant (Ribes aureum), blackcurrant (Ribes nigrum), Canadian gooseberry (Ribes oxyacanthoides), rock currant (Ribes petraeum) and European gooseberry (Ribes uva-crispa).

Other species
Damage, such as buckled, crumpled, inrolled and distorted leaves, can be caused by other species of aphids, but without the thickening of tissue are not considered to be true galls.

Distribution
Cryptomyzus ribis is found in most of mainland Europe, with the exception of Albania, Austria, Croatia, Gibraltar, Liechtenstein, Luxembourg, Portugal and Turkey.

References

Aphididae
Gall-inducing insects
Bugs described in 1758
Insects of Europe
Taxa named by Carl Linnaeus